Carsten Hemmingsen (born 18 December 1970) is a Danish former professional football player who played as a midfielder. He is the currently head coach of the Danish club Slagelse B&I. He is the brother of Michael Hemmingsen.

In 1995, he made one appearance for the Denmark national football team.

References

External links
F.C. Copenhagen stats
Official Danish League Statistics
National team profile

1970 births
Living people
Danish men's footballers
Odense Boldklub players
F.C. Copenhagen players
Vejle Boldklub players
Aarhus Gymnastikforening players
Denmark international footballers
1995 King Fahd Cup players
FIFA Confederations Cup-winning players
Footballers from Odense
Association football midfielders
Boldklubben 1913 players
Danish football managers
SfB-Oure FA managers
Odder IGF managers